The 2014 season is Sporting Cristal's 59th season in the Peruvian First Division, and also the club's 59th consecutive season in the top-flight of Peruvian football.

Sporting Cristal will compete for their 17th Torneo Descentralizado title and classified to the Copa Libertadores 2014 for second consecutive year. They will also enter the Copa Inca.

Club

Coaching staff

Grounds

|}

Players

Squad information

Transfers

In
.

Out
.

Pre-season and friendlies

Last updated: 7 January 2014

Competitions

Overall

Torneo Descentralizado

Torneo del Inca

Torneo Apertura

Torneo Clausura

Finals

Copa Libertadores

First stage

Last updated: 7 January 2014
Source:Matches

References  

Sporting Cristal seasons